Rakitnica is a village in the Municipality of Ribnica in southern Slovenia. The area is part of the traditional region of Lower Carniola and is now included in the Southeast Slovenia Statistical Region.

The local church, built next to the cemetery in the western part of the settlement, is dedicated to Saint Vitus and belongs to the Parish of Dolenja Vas. It was built in the mid-18th century on the site of an older church. The main altar dates to 1876.

References

External links
Rakitnica on Geopedia

Populated places in the Municipality of Ribnica